The Rhenish-Westphalian Coal Syndicate (ger.: Rheinisch-Westfälisches Kohlen-Syndikat -RWKS) was a cartel established in 1893 in Essen bringing together the major coal producers in the Ruhr.

The syndicate was set up as coal producers moved towards using shipping rather than railways to deliver their coal to Rotterdam. The cartel co-operated with the Dutch Coal Trade Union, to whom they gave the sole distribution rights for Westphalian coal. Daniël George van Beuningen of the Steenkolen Handels Vereniging was a leading figure in this relationship, greatly increasing the amount of coal imported to Rotterdam and resulting in the cost of using Rhine based barges dropping as their greater use also stimulated technical innovation.

This arrangement led to Rotterdam becoming not just the leading coal transhipment port in the Netherlands but also evolving into the major bunker port in Europe. In 1913 this coal transhipment accounted for over two thirds of the total shipping on the Rhine. By this time the Rhenish-Westphalian Coal Syndicate accounted for 93% of the coal output in the Ruhr and 54% of Germany as a whole.

Chairmen of Supervisory Board 

 1893 – 1925 Emil Kirdorf
 1925 – 1927 Albert Vögler
 1927 – 1935 Erich Fickler
 1935 – 1942 Hermann Kellermann
 1942 – 19?? Herbert Kauert

References

External links

See also 
F. H. Fentener van Vlissingen

Cartels
Organizations established in 1893
1893 in economics
Energy in Europe
International trade organizations
Coal organizations
Companies based in Essen
Companies of Prussia
Rotterdam
Coal industry